Yagoona railway station is located on the Bankstown line, serving the Sydney suburb of Yagoona. It is served by Sydney Trains T3 Bankstown line services.

History
Yagoona station opened on 16 July 1928, when the Bankstown line was extended from Bankstown to Regents Park.

In 2018, the NSW Government considered extending the Sydney Metro Southwest line north beyond Bankstown to Yagoona as the terminal. However, due to NSW Government budgetary constraints, a lack of community support, and the future extension of the Metro line west from Bankstown to Liverpool using a new rail corridor, the proposed Yagoona Metro terminal was abandoned.

In 2020, following the NSW Legislative Council Inquiry into Sydenham to Bankstown line conversion's review of Transport for NSW plans to close stations in the west of Bankstown, the NSW Government announced a Bankstown to Lidcombe shuttle service would operate in the short-term through Yagoona once Sydney Metro Southwest opened in 2024.

Platforms & services

Transport links
Transdev NSW operates two routes via Yagoona station:
907: Bankstown station to Parramatta station
M91: Parramatta station to Hurstville

References

External links

Yagoona station details Transport for New South Wales

City of Canterbury-Bankstown
Railway stations in Sydney
Railway stations in Australia opened in 1928
Bankstown railway line